Gwynn Murrill (born 1942) is an American sculptor.

A native of Ann Arbor, Michigan, Murrill earned her Master of Fine Arts degree at the University of California, Los Angeles. She is known most especially for her animal sculptures in a variety of media. In 1986 she received a Guggenheim Fellowship; she received a grant from the National Endowment for the Arts in 1984 and 1985, a Rome Prize in 1979 and 1980, and a new talent purchase award from the Los Angeles County Museum of Art, which is among the organizations owning examples of her work.

References

1942 births
Living people
American women sculptors
20th-century American sculptors
20th-century American women artists
21st-century American sculptors
21st-century American women artists
Animal artists
Artists from Ann Arbor, Michigan
University of California, Los Angeles alumni
Sculptors from Michigan